John Trevor may refer to:

Religion
John Trevor (died 1357), Bishop of St Asaph
John Trevor (died 1410), Bishop of St Asaph
John Trevor (1855–1930), Unitarian minister who formed The Labour Church

Politicians
Sir John Trevor (1563–1630), MP and Surveyor of the Queen's Ships
Sir John Trevor (1596–1673), his son, MP from 1620, member of the Council of State during the Protectorate
Sir John Trevor (1626–1672), his son, Secretary of State for the Northern Department during the 17th century
Sir John Trevor (speaker) (1637–1717), Speaker of the House of Commons and Master of the Rolls in the late 17th and 18th centuries
John Morley Trevor (the elder) (1681–1719), grandson of the Secretary of State for the Northern Department, MP for Lewes and Sussex
John Morley Trevor (the younger) (1717–1743), son of the above, MP for Lewes
John Trevor, 3rd Viscount Hampden (1748–1824), 18th century British diplomatist
John B. Trevor (Pennsylvania politician), Pennsylvania State Treasurer

Others
John Bond Trevor (1822-1890), American financer and Wall Street pioneer
John B. Trevor Sr. (1878–1956), American lawyer and immigration reformer
John B. Trevor Jr. (1909–2006), electrical engineer and author

See also